The Changhua Wude Hall is a former martial arts training center in Changhua City, Changhua County, Taiwan.

History
The construction of the hall started in 1929 and was completed on 18 October 1930 during the Japanese rule of Taiwan. After the handover of Taiwan from Japan to the Republic of China in 1945, the hall was transformed into Changhua Martyrs' Shrine. The hall was partially damaged during the Jiji earthquake in 1999. During the reparation process, care was taken to maintain the building's original look. The hall was declared as a historical building on 13 December 2001. The restoration work was fully completed in October 2005.

Transportation
The hall is within walking distance southeast of Changhua Station of Taiwan Railways.

See also
 List of tourist attractions in Taiwan

References

1930 establishments in Taiwan
Buildings and structures completed in 1930
Buildings and structures in Changhua County
Changhua City
Martial art halls in Taiwan